Gwen Stefani – Just a Girl was a concert residency held at the Zappos Theater in Las Vegas by American singer Gwen Stefani. The show, which is named after the song of the same name by Stefani's band No Doubt, opened on June 27, 2018, and concluded on November 6, 2021. Originally scheduled to end on May 16, 2020, the final eight performances were postponed due to the COVID-19 pandemic.

Background
The residency was officially announced on April 10, 2018. Tickets for the initial 25 shows between June 2018 and March 2019 went on sale on April 13. On December 3, 2018, 21 dates between July 5 and November 2, 2019, were announced.

Set list 
This setlist was obtained from the June 27, 2018, concert, held at the Zappos Theater in Las Vegas, Nevada. It does not represent all concerts for the duration of the residency shows.

 "Hollaback Girl"
 "Bathwater"
 "Baby Don't Lie"
 "It's My Life"
 "Spiderwebs"
 "Sunday Morning"
 "Underneath It All" / "The Tide is High"
 "Ex-Girlfriend" / "Hella Good"
 "Harajuku Girls"
 "Wind It Up"
 "Rich Girl"
 "Cool"
 "Luxurious"
 "Umbrella"
 "What You Waiting For?"
 "Used to Love You"
 "Misery"
 "Don't Speak"
Encore
  "Make Me Like You"
 "Hey Baby"
 "Just a Girl"
 "The Sweet Escape"

Notes
"Simple Kind Of Life" was dropped from the setlist on July 3, 2018.

Shows

Cancelled shows

Notes

References

2018 concert residencies
2019 concert residencies
2020 concert residencies
2021 concert residencies
Concert residencies in the Las Vegas Valley
Gwen Stefani concert tours
Zappos Theater
Music events cancelled due to the COVID-19 pandemic